Danijel Hrman (born 7 August 1975) is a retired Croatian football midfielder.

Club career
In 1997 Hrman started his football career with NK Varteks, where he played six seasons before moving to Russia to play in the capital for Spartak Moscow. After a season there he returned to Croatia, playing for Dinamo Zagreb and Hajduk Split, before returning to NK Varteks. He signed for SK Tirana in the 2007 summer break but was soon back with NK Varteks as a free player.

Hrman is said to have played for Tirana in Albania, but he has refuted these claims.

International career
He made his international debut against South Korea in the 2-0 friendly win in Seoul on 10 November 2001. He has made four appearances for the Croatia national football team, his final international being a February 2003 friendly match against Macedonia.

References

External links 
 
 Danijel Hrman at the Croatian Football Federation

1975 births
Living people
People from Ivanec
Association football midfielders
Croatian footballers
Croatia international footballers
NK Varaždin players
FC Spartak Moscow players
GNK Dinamo Zagreb players
HNK Hajduk Split players
KF Tirana players
Croatian Football League players
Russian Premier League players
Croatian expatriate footballers
Expatriate footballers in Russia
Croatian expatriate sportspeople in Russia